Dahomy is an unincorporated community in Bolivar County, Mississippi, United States.

History
The Dahomey Plantation was founded in 1833 by F.G. Ellis, who named it after Dahomey, the homeland of his slaves.  The plantation became the largest cotton plantation in the world.

The settlement of Dahomy was likely established when the Louisville, New Orleans and Texas Railway was completed through the plantation in the 1880s.

A post office was established prior to 1907 and closed in 1937.

References

Unincorporated communities in Bolivar County, Mississippi
Unincorporated communities in Mississippi